

Events

Pre-1600
 491 – Flavius Anastasius becomes Byzantine emperor, with the name of Anastasius I.
1241 – Batu Khan defeats Béla IV of Hungary at the Battle of Mohi.
1512 – War of the League of Cambrai: Franco-Ferrarese forces led by Gaston de Foix and Alfonso I d'Este win the Battle of Ravenna against the Papal-Spanish forces.
1544 – Italian War of 1542–46: A French army defeats Habsburg forces at the Battle of Ceresole, but fails to exploit its victory.

1601–1900
1689 – William III and Mary II are crowned as joint sovereigns of Great Britain on the same day that the Scottish Parliament concurs with the English decision of 12 February.
1713 – France and Great Britain sign the Treaty of Utrecht, bringing an end to the War of the Spanish Succession (Queen Anne's War). Britain accepts Philip V as King of Spain, while Philip renounces any claim to the French throne.
1727 – Premiere of Johann Sebastian Bach's St Matthew Passion BWV 244b at St. Thomas Church in Leipzig, Electorate of Saxony (now Germany).
1809 – Battle of the Basque Roads: Admiral Lord Gambier fails to support Captain Lord Cochrane, leading to an incomplete British victory over the French fleet.
1814 – The Treaty of Fontainebleau ends the War of the Sixth Coalition against Napoleon Bonaparte, and forces him to abdicate unconditionally for the first time.
1856 – Second Battle of Rivas: Juan Santamaría burns down the hostel where William Walker's filibusters are holed up.
1868 – Former shōgun Tokugawa Yoshinobu surrenders Edo Castle to Imperial forces, marking the end of the Tokugawa shogunate.
1876 – The Benevolent and Protective Order of Elks is organized.
1881 – Spelman College is founded in Atlanta, Georgia as the Atlanta Baptist Female Seminary, an institute of higher education for African-American women.

1901–present
1908 – , the last armored cruiser to be built by the Imperial German Navy, is launched.
1909 – The city of Tel Aviv is founded.
1921 – Emir Abdullah establishes the first centralised government in the newly created British protectorate of Transjordan.
1935 – Stresa Front: opening of the conference between the British Prime Minister Ramsay MacDonald, the Italian Prime Minister Benito Mussolini and the French Minister for Foreign Affairs Pierre Laval to condemn the German violations of the Treaty of Versailles.
1945 – World War II: American forces liberate the Buchenwald concentration camp.
1951 – Korean War: President Truman relieves Douglas MacArthur of the command of American forces in Korea and Japan.
  1951   – The Stone of Scone, the stone upon which Scottish monarchs were traditionally crowned, is found on the site of the altar of Arbroath Abbey. It had been taken by Scottish nationalist students from its place in Westminster Abbey.
1952 – Bolivian National Revolution: Rebels take over Palacio Quemado.
1955 – The Air India Kashmir Princess is bombed and crashes in a failed assassination attempt on Zhou Enlai by the Kuomintang.
1957 – United Kingdom agrees to Singaporean self-rule.
1961 – The trial of Adolf Eichmann begins in Jerusalem.
1963 – Pope John XXIII issues Pacem in terris, the first encyclical addressed to all Christians instead of only Catholics, and which described the conditions for world peace in human terms.
1964 – Brazilian Marshal Humberto de Alencar Castelo Branco is elected president by the National Congress.
1965 – The Palm Sunday tornado outbreak of 1965: Fifty-one tornadoes hit in six Midwestern states, killing 256 people.
1968 – President Lyndon B. Johnson signs the Civil Rights Act of 1968, prohibiting discrimination in the sale, rental, and financing of housing.
  1968   – Assassination attempt on Rudi Dutschke, leader of the German student movement.
1970 – Apollo Program: Apollo 13 is launched.
1976 – The Apple I is created.
1977 – London Transport's Silver Jubilee AEC Routemaster buses are launched.
1979 – Ugandan dictator Idi Amin is deposed.
1981 – A massive riot in Brixton, south London results in almost 300 police injuries and 65 serious civilian injuries.
1986 – FBI Miami Shootout: A gun battle in broad daylight in Dade County, Florida between two bank/armored car robbers and pursuing FBI agents. During the firefight, FBI agents Jerry L. Dove and Benjamin P. Grogan were killed, while five other agents were wounded. As a result, the popular .40 S&W cartridge was developed.
1987 – The London Agreement is secretly signed between Israeli Foreign Affairs Minister Shimon Peres and King Hussein of Jordan.
1990 – Customs officers in Middlesbrough, England, seize what they believe to be the barrel of a massive gun on a ship bound for Iraq.
1993 – Four hundred fifty prisoners rioted at the Southern Ohio Correctional Facility in Lucasville, Ohio, and continued to do so for ten days, citing grievances related to prison conditions, as well as the forced vaccination of Nation of Islam prisoners (for tuberculosis) against their religious beliefs.
2001 – The detained crew of a United States EP-3E aircraft that landed in Hainan, China after a collision with a J-8 fighter, is released.
2002 – The Ghriba synagogue bombing by al-Qaeda kills 21 in Tunisia.
  2002   – Over two hundred thousand people march in Caracas towards the presidential palace to demand the resignation of President Hugo Chávez. Nineteen protesters are killed.
2006 – Iranian president Mahmoud Ahmadinejad announces Iran's claim to have successfully enriched uranium.
2007 – Algiers bombings: Two bombings in Algiers kill 33 people and wound a further 222 others.
2011 – An explosion in the Minsk Metro, Belarus kills 15 people and injures 204 others.
2012 – A pair of great earthquakes occur in the Wharton Basin west of Sumatra in Indonesia. The maximum Mercalli intensity of this strike-slip doublet earthquake is VII (Very strong). Ten are killed, twelve are injured, and a non-destructive tsunami is observed on the island of Nias.
2018 – An Ilyushin Il-76 which was owned and operated by the Algerian Air Force crashes near Boufarik, Algeria, killing 257.
2021 – Twenty year old Daunte Wright is shot and killed in Brooklyn Center, Minnesota by officer Kimberly Potter, sparking protests in the city, when the officer allegedly mistakes her own gun for her taser.

Births

Pre-1600
145 – Septimius Severus, Roman emperor (probable; d. 211)
1184 – William of Winchester, Lord of Lüneburg (d. 1213)
1348 – Andronikos IV Palaiologos, Byzantine Emperor (d. 1385)
1357 – John I of Portugal (d. 1433)
1370 – Frederick I, Elector of Saxony (d. 1428)
1374 – Roger Mortimer, 4th Earl of March, heir to the throne of England (d. 1398)
1493 – George I, Duke of Pomerania (d. 1531)
1591 – Bartholomeus Strobel, Silezian painter (d. 1650)
1592 – John Eliot, English lawyer and politician (d. 1632)

1601–1900
1644 – Marie Jeanne Baptiste of Savoy-Nemours, Duchess of Savoy (d. 1724)
1658 – James Hamilton, 4th Duke of Hamilton, Scottish peer (d. 1712)
1683 – Jean-Joseph Mouret, French composer and conductor (d. 1738)
1715 – John Alcock, English organist and composer (d. 1806)
1721 – David Zeisberger, Czech-American clergyman and missionary (d. 1808)
1722 – Christopher Smart, English actor, playwright, and poet (d. 1771)
1749 – Adélaïde Labille-Guiard, French miniaturist and portrait painter (d. 1803)
1755 – James Parkinson, English surgeon, geologist, and paleontologist (d. 1824)
1770 – George Canning, Irish-English lawyer and politician, Prime Minister of the United Kingdom (d. 1827)
1794 – Edward Everett, English-American educator and politician, 15th Governor of Massachusetts (d. 1865)
1798 – Macedonio Melloni, Italian physicist and academic (d. 1854)
1819 – Charles Hallé, German-English pianist and conductor (d. 1895)
1825 – Ferdinand Lassalle, German philosopher and jurist (d. 1864)
1827 – Jyotirao Phule, Indian scholar, philosopher, and activist (d. 1890)
1854 – Hugh Massie, Australian cricketer (d. 1938)
1856 – Arthur Shrewsbury, English cricketer and rugby player (d. 1903)
1859 – Stefanos Thomopoulos, Greek historian and author (d. 1939)
1862 – William Wallace Campbell, American astronomer and academic (d. 1938)
  1862   – Charles Evans Hughes, American lawyer and politician, 44th United States Secretary of State (d. 1948)
1864 – Johanna Elberskirchen, German author and activist (d. 1943)
1866 – Bernard O'Dowd, Australian journalist, author, and poet (d. 1953)
1867 – Mark Keppel, American educator (d. 1928)
1869 – Gustav Vigeland, Norwegian sculptor, designed the Nobel Peace Prize medal (d. 1943)
1871 – Gyula Kellner, Hungarian runner (d. 1940)
1872 – Aleksandër Stavre Drenova, Albanian poet, rilindas and author of national anthem of Albania (d. 1947)
1873 – Edward Lawson, English soldier, Victoria Cross recipient (d. 1955)
1876 – Paul Henry, Irish painter (d. 1958)
  1876   – Ivane Javakhishvili, Georgian historian and academic (d. 1940)
1879 – Bernhard Schmidt, Estonian-German astronomer and optician (d. 1935)
1887 – Jamini Roy, Indian painter (d. 1972)
1893 – Dean Acheson, American lawyer and politician, 51st United States Secretary of State (d. 1971)
1896 – Léo-Paul Desrosiers, Canadian journalist and author (d. 1967)
1899 – Percy Lavon Julian, African-American chemist and academic (d. 1975)
1900 – Sándor Márai, Hungarian journalist and author (d. 1989)

1901–present
1903 – Misuzu Kaneko, Japanese poet (d. 1930)
1904 – K. L. Saigal, Indian singer and actor (d. 1947) 
1905 – Attila József, Hungarian poet and educator (d. 1937)
1906 – Dale Messick, American author and illustrator (d. 2005)
1907 – Paul Douglas, American actor (d. 1959)
1908 – Jane Bolin, American lawyer and judge (d. 2007)
  1908   – Masaru Ibuka, Japanese businessman, co-founded Sony (d. 1997)
  1908   – Dan Maskell, English tennis player and sportscaster (d. 1992)
  1908   – Leo Rosten, Polish-American author and academic (d. 1997)
1910 – António de Spínola, Portuguese general and politician, 14th President of Portugal (d. 1996)
1912 – John Levy, American bassist and businessman (d. 2012)
1913 – Oleg Cassini, French-American fashion designer (d. 2006)
1914 – Norman McLaren, Scottish-Canadian animator, director, and producer (d. 1987)
  1914   – Robert Stanfield, Canadian economist, lawyer, and politician, 17th Premier of Nova Scotia (d. 2003)
  1914   – Dorothy Lewis Bernstein, American mathematician (d. 1988)
1916 – Alberto Ginastera, Argentinian pianist and composer (d. 1983)
  1916   – Howard W. Koch, American director and producer (d. 2001)
1917 – David Westheimer, American soldier, journalist, and author (d. 2005)
1918 – Richard Wainwright, English soldier and politician (d. 2003)
1919 – Raymond Carr, English historian and academic (d. 2015)
1920 – Emilio Colombo, Italian lawyer and politician, 40th Prime Minister of Italy (d. 2013)
  1920   – William Royer, American soldier and politician (d. 2013)
1921 – Jim Hearn, American baseball player (d. 1998)
  1921   – Jack Rayner, Australian rugby league player and coach (d. 2008)
1922 – Arved Viirlaid, Estonian-Canadian soldier and author (d. 2015)
1923 – George J. Maloof, Sr., American businessman (d. 1980)
1924 – Mohammad Naseem, Pakistani-English activist and politician (d. 2014)
1925 – Yuriy Lituyev, Russian hurdler and commander (d. 2000)
  1925   – Viola Liuzzo, American civil rights activist (d. 1965)
  1925   – Viktor Masing, Estonian botanist and ecologist (d. 2001)
  1925   – Pierre Péladeau, Canadian businessman, founded Quebecor (d. 1997)
1926 – David Manker Abshire, American commander and diplomat, United States Permanent Representative to NATO (d. 2014)
  1926   – Victor Bouchard, Canadian pianist and composer (d. 2011)
  1926   – Karl Rebane, Estonian physicist and academic (d. 2007)
1927 – Lokesh Chandra, Indian historian
1928 – Ethel Kennedy, American philanthropist
  1928   – Edwin Pope, American journalist and author (d. 2017)
  1928   – Tommy Tycho, Hungarian-Australian pianist, composer, and conductor (d. 2013)
1930 – Nicholas F. Brady, American businessman and politician, 68th United States Secretary of the Treasury
  1930   – Walter Krüger, German javelin thrower (d. 2018)
  1930   – Anton LaVey, American occultist, founded the Church of Satan (d. 1997)
1931 – Lewis Jones, Welsh rugby player and coach
1932 – Joel Grey, American actor, singer, and dancer
1933 – Tony Brown, American journalist and academic
1934 – Mark Strand, Canadian-born American poet, essayist, and translator (d. 2014)
  1934   – Ron Pember, English actor, director and playwright (d. 2022)
1935 – Richard Berry, American singer-songwriter (d. 1997)
1936 – Brian Noble, English bishop (d. 2019)
1937 – Jill Gascoine, English actress and author (d. 2020)
1938 – Gerry Baker, American soccer player and manager (d. 2013)
  1938   – Michael Deaver, American politician, Deputy White House Chief of Staff (d. 2007)
  1938   – Reatha King, American chemist and businesswoman
1939 – Luther Johnson, American singer and guitarist
  1939   – Louise Lasser, American actress 
1940 – Col Firmin, Australian politician (d. 2013)
  1940   – Władysław Komar, Polish shot putter and actor (d. 1998)
1941 – Ellen Goodman, American journalist and author
  1941   – Shirley Stelfox, English actress (d. 2015)
1942 – Anatoly Berezovoy, Russian colonel, pilot, and astronaut (d. 2014)
  1942   – Hattie Gossett, American writer
  1942   – James Underwood, English pathologist and academic
1943 – John Montagu, 11th Earl of Sandwich, English businessman and politician
  1943   – Harley Race, American wrestler and trainer (d. 2019)
1944 – Peter Barfuß, German footballer
  1944   – John Milius, American director, producer, and screenwriter
1945 – John Krebs, Baron Krebs, English zoologist and academic
1946 – Chris Burden, American sculptor, illustrator, and academic (d. 2015)
  1946   – Bob Harris, English journalist and radio host
1947 – Lev Bulat, Ukrainian-Russian physicist and academic (d. 2016)
  1947   – Uli Edel, German director and screenwriter
  1947   – Frank Mantooth, American pianist and composer (d. 2004)
  1947   – Peter Riegert, American actor, screenwriter and film director
  1947   – Michael T. Wright, English engineer and academic (d. 2015)
1949 – Bernd Eichinger, German director and producer (d. 2011)
1950 – Bill Irwin, American actor and clown
1951 – Paul Fox, English singer and guitarist (d. 2007)
1952 – Nancy Honeytree, American singer and guitarist
  1952   – Indira Samarasekera, Sri Lankan engineer and academic
  1952   – Peter Windsor, English-Australian journalist and sportscaster
1953 – Guy Verhofstadt, Belgian politician, 47th Prime Minister of Belgium
  1953   – Andrew Wiles, English mathematician and academic
1954 – Abdullah Atalar, Turkish engineer and academic
  1954   – Aleksandr Averin, Azerbaijani cyclist and coach
  1954   – Francis Lickerish, English guitarist and composer 
  1954   – David Perrett, Scottish psychologist and academic
  1954   – Ian Redmond, English biologist and conservationist
  1954   – Willie Royster, American baseball player (d. 2015)
1955 – Kevin Brady, American lawyer and politician
  1955   – Michael Callen, American singer-songwriter and AIDS activist (d. 1993)
  1955   – Micheal Ray Richardson, American basketball player and coach
1958 – Stuart Adamson, Scottish singer-songwriter and guitarist (d. 2001)
  1958   – Lyudmila Kondratyeva, Russian sprinter
1959 – Pierre Lacroix, Canadian ice hockey player
  1959   – Ana María Polo, Cuban-American lawyer and judge
  1959   – Zahid Maleque, Bangladeshi politician
1960 – Jeremy Clarkson, English journalist and television presenter
1961 – Vincent Gallo, American actor, director, producer, and musician
  1961   – Doug Hopkins, American guitarist and songwriter (d. 1993)
  1961   – Nobuaki Kakuda, Japanese martial artist
1962 – Franck Ducheix, French fencer
  1962   – Mark Lawson, English journalist and author
1963 – Billy Bowden, New Zealand cricketer and umpire
  1963   – Waldemar Fornalik, Polish footballer and manager
  1963   – Elizabeth Smylie, Australian tennis player
  1963   – Eleni Tsaligopoulou, Greek singer 
1964 – Steve Azar, American singer-songwriter and guitarist
  1964   – John Cryer, English journalist and politician
  1964   – Johann Sebastian Paetsch, American cellist
  1964   – Bret Saberhagen, American baseball player and coach
  1964   – Patrick Sang, Kenyan runner
1966 – Steve Scarsone, American baseball player and manager
  1966   – Shin Seung-hun, South Korean singer-songwriter
  1966   – Lisa Stansfield, English singer-songwriter and actress 
1968 – Sergei Lukyanenko, Kazakh-Russian journalist and author
1969 – Cerys Matthews, Welsh singer-songwriter
  1969   – Michael von Grünigen, Swiss skier 
1970 – Trevor Linden, Canadian ice hockey player and manager
1971 – Oliver Riedel, German bass player
1972 – Balls Mahoney, American wrestler (d. 2016)
  1972   – Allan Théo, French singer
  1972   – Jason Varitek, American baseball player and manager
  1972   – Jennifer Esposito, American actress and writer
1973 – Olivier Magne, French rugby player
1974 – Àlex Corretja, Spanish tennis player and coach
  1974   – Ashot Danielyan, Armenian weightlifter
  1974   – David Jassy, Swedish singer-songwriter and producer 
  1974   – Tom Thacker, Canadian singer-songwriter, guitarist, and producer
  1974   – Trot Nixon, American baseball player and sportscaster
1976 – Kelvim Escobar, Venezuelan baseball player
  1976   – Kotomitsuki Keiji, Japanese sumo wrestler
1977 – Ivonne Teichmann, German runner
1978 – Josh Hancock, American baseball player (d. 2007)
1979 – Malcolm Christie, English footballer
  1979   – Sebastien Grainger, Canadian singer-songwriter and guitarist 
  1979   – Michel Riesen, Swiss ice hockey player
  1979   – Josh Server, American actor 
1980 – Keiji Tamada, Japanese footballer
  1980   – Mark Teixeira, American baseball player
1981 – Alessandra Ambrosio, Brazilian model
  1981   – Alexandre Burrows, Canadian ice hockey player
  1981   – Luis Flores, Dominican basketball player
  1981   – Veronica Pyke, Australian cricketer
1982 – Ian Bell, English cricketer
  1982   – Peeter Kümmel, Estonian skier
1983 – Jennifer Heil, Canadian skier
  1983   – Rubén Palazuelos, Spanish footballer
  1983   – Nicky Pastorelli, Dutch race car driver
1984 – Kelli Garner, American actress
  1984   – Nikola Karabatić, French handball player
1985 – Pablo Hernández Domínguez, Spanish footballer
  1985   – Will Minson, Australian footballer
1986 – Sarodj Bertin, Haitian model and human rights lawyer
  1986   – Lena Schöneborn, German pentathlete
1987 – Joss Stone, English singer-songwriter and actress
  1987   – Lights, Canadian singer-songwriter
1988 – Leland Irving, Canadian ice hockey player
  1989   – Torrin Lawrence, American sprinter (d. 2014)
1990 – Dimitrios Anastasopoulos, Greek footballer
  1990   – Thulani Serero, South African footballer
1991 – Thiago Alcântara, Spanish footballer
  1991   – Brennan Poole, American racing driver
1996 – Dele Alli, English international footballer
2000 – Milly Alcock, Australian actress

Deaths

Pre-1600
 618 – Yang Guang, Chinese emperor of the Sui Dynasty (b. 569)
 678 – Donus, pope of the Catholic Church (b. 610)
 924 – Herman I, chancellor and archbishop of Cologne
1034 – Romanos III Argyros, Byzantine emperor (b. 968)
1077 – Anawrahta, king of Burma and founder of the Pagan Empire (b. 1014)
1079 – Stanislaus of Szczepanów, bishop of Kraków (b. 1030)
1165 – Stephen IV, king of Hungary and Croatia
1240 – Llywelyn the Great, Welsh prince (b. 1172)
1349 – Ramadan ibn Alauddin, first known Muslim from Korea
1447 – Henry Beaufort, Cardinal, Lord Chancellor of England (b. 1377)
1512 – Gaston de Foix, French military commander (b. 1489)
1554 – Thomas Wyatt the Younger, English rebel leader (b. 1521)
1587 – Thomas Bromley, English lord chancellor (b. 1530)

1601–1900
1609 – John Lumley, 1st Baron Lumley, English noble (b. 1533)
1612 – Emanuel van Meteren, Flemish historian and author (b. 1535)
  1612   – Edward Wightman, English minister and martyr (b. 1566)
1626 – Marino Ghetaldi, Ragusan mathematician and physicist (b. 1568)
1712 – Richard Simon, French priest and critic (b. 1638)
1723 – John Robinson, English bishop and diplomat (b. 1650)
1783 – Nikita Ivanovich Panin, Polish-Russian politician, Russian Minister of Foreign Affairs (b. 1718)
1798 – Karl Wilhelm Ramler, German poet and academic (b. 1725)
1856 – Juan Santamaría, Costa Rican soldier (b. 1831)
1861 – Francisco González Bocanegra, Mexican poet and composer (b. 1824)
1873 – Edward Canby, American general (b. 1817)
1890 – David de Jahacob Lopez Cardozo, Dutch Talmudist (b. 1808)
  1890   – Joseph Merrick, English man with severe deformities (b. 1862)
1894 – Constantin Lipsius, German architect and theorist (b. 1832) 
1895 – Julius Lothar Meyer, German chemist (b. 1830)

1901–present
1902 – Wade Hampton III, Confederate general and politician, 77th Governor of South Carolina (b. 1818)
1903 – Gemma Galgani, Italian mystic and saint (b. 1878)
1906 – James Anthony Bailey, American businessman, co-founded Ringling Bros. and Barnum & Bailey Circus (b. 1847)
  1906   – Francis Pharcellus Church, American journalist and publisher, co-founded Armed Forces Journal and The Galaxy Magazine (b. 1839)
1908 – Henry Bird, English chess player and author (b. 1829)
1916 – Richard Harding Davis, American journalist and author (b. 1864)
1918 – Otto Wagner, Austrian architect and urban planner (b. 1841)
1926 – Luther Burbank, American botanist and academic (b. 1849)
1939 – Kurtdereli Mehmet, Turkish wrestler (b. 1864)
1953 – Kid Nichols, American baseball player and manager (b. 1869)
1954 – Paul Specht, American violinist and bandleader (b. 1895)
1958 – Konstantin Yuon, Russian painter and educator (b. 1875)
1960 – Rosa Grünberg, Swedish actress (b. 1878)
1962 – Ukichiro Nakaya, Japanese physicist and academic (b. 1900)
  1962   – George Poage, American hurdler and educator (b. 1880)
1967 – Thomas Farrell, American general (b. 1891)
  1967   – Donald Sangster, Jamaican lawyer and politician, 2nd Prime Minister of Jamaica (b. 1911)
1970 – Cathy O'Donnell, American actress (b. 1923)
  1970   – John O'Hara, American novelist and short story writer (b. 1905)
1974 – Ernst Ziegler, German actor (b. 1894)
1977 – Jacques Prévert, French poet and screenwriter (b. 1900)
  1977   – Phanishwar Nath 'Renu', Indian author and activist (b. 1921)
1980 – Ümit Kaftancıoğlu, Turkish journalist and producer (b. 1935)
1981 – Caroline Gordon, American author and critic (b. 1895)
1983 – Dolores del Río, Mexican actress (b. 1904)
1984 – Edgar V. Saks, Estonian historian and politician, Estonian Minister of Education (b. 1910)
1985 – Bunny Ahearne, Irish-born English businessman (b. 1900)
  1985   – John Gilroy, English artist and illustrator (b. 1898)
  1985   – Enver Hoxha, Albanian educator and politician, 21st Prime Minister of Albania (b. 1908)
1987 – Erskine Caldwell, American novelist and short story writer (b. 1903)
  1987   – Primo Levi, Italian chemist and author (b. 1919)
1990 – Harold Ballard, Canadian businessman (b. 1903)
1991 – Walker Cooper, American baseball player and manager (b. 1915)
  1991   – Bruno Hoffmann. German glass harp player (b. 1913)
1992 – James Brown, American actor and singer (b. 1920)
  1992   – Eve Merriam, American author and poet (b. 1916)
  1992   – Alejandro Obregón, Colombian painter, sculptor, and engraver (b. 1920)
1996 – Jessica Dubroff, American pilot (b. 1988)
1997 – Muriel McQueen Fergusson, Canadian lawyer and politician, Canadian Speaker of the Senate (b. 1899)
  1997   – Wang Xiaobo, contemporary Chinese novelist and essayist (b. 1952)
1999 – William H. Armstrong, American author and educator (b. 1911)
2000 – Diana Darvey, English actress, singer and dancer (b. 1945)
2001 – Harry Secombe, Welsh-English actor (b. 1921)
2003 – Cecil Howard Green, English-American geophysicist and businessman, founded Texas Instruments (b. 1900)
2005 – André François, Romanian-French cartoonist, painter, and sculptor (b. 1915)
  2005   – Lucien Laurent, French footballer and coach (b. 1907)
2006 – June Pointer, American singer (b. 1953)
  2006   – DeShaun Holton, American rapper and actor (b. 1973)
2007 – Roscoe Lee Browne, American actor and director (b. 1922)
  2007   – Loïc Leferme, French diver (b. 1970)
  2007   – Janet McDonald, American lawyer and author (b. 1954)
  2007   – Ronald Speirs, Scottish-American colonel (b. 1920)
  2007   – Kurt Vonnegut, American novelist, short story writer, and playwright (b. 1922)
2008 – Merlin German, American sergeant (b. 1985)
2009 – Gerda Gilboe, Danish actress and singer (b. 1914)
  2009   – Vishnu Prabhakar, Indian author and playwright (b. 1912)
  2009   – Corín Tellado, Spanish author (b. 1927)
2010 – Julia Tsenova, Bulgarian pianist and composer (b. 1948)
2011 – Larry Sweeney, American wrestler and manager (b. 1981)
2012 – Ahmed Ben Bella, Algerian soldier and politician, 1st President of Algeria (b. 1916)
  2012   – Roger Caron, Canadian criminal and author (b. 1938)
  2012   – Tippy Dye, American basketball player and coach (b. 1915)
  2012   – Hal McKusick, American saxophonist, clarinet player, and flute player (b. 1924)
  2012   – Agustin Roman, American bishop (b. 1928)
2013 – Don Blackman, American singer-songwriter, pianist, and producer (b. 1953)
  2013   – Sue Draheim, American fiddler (b.1949)
  2013   – Grady Hatton, American baseball player, coach, and manager (b. 1922)
  2013   – Thomas Hemsley, English actor and singer (b. 1927)
  2013   – Hilary Koprowski, Polish-American virologist and immunologist (b. 1916)
  2013   – Gilles Marchal, French singer-songwriter (b. 1944)
  2013   – Maria Tallchief, American ballerina (b. 1925)
  2013   – Clorindo Testa, Italian-Argentinian architect (b. 1923)
  2013   – Jonathan Winters, American comedian, actor and screenwriter (b. 1925)
2014 – Rolf Brem, Swiss sculptor and illustrator (b. 1926)
  2014   – Edna Doré, English actress (b. 1921)
  2014   – Bill Henry, American baseball player (b. 1927)
  2014   – Lou Hudson, American basketball player and sportscaster (b. 1944)
  2014   – Myer S. Kripke, American rabbi and scholar (b. 1914)
  2014   – Sergey Nepobedimy, Russian engineer (b. 1921)
  2014   – Jesse Winchester, American singer-songwriter, guitarist, and producer (b. 1944)
2015 – Jimmy Gunn, American football player (b. 1948)
  2015   – Muhammad Kamaruzzaman, Bangladeshi journalist and politician (b. 1952)
  2015   – François Maspero, French journalist and author (b. 1932)
  2015   – Hanut Singh, Indian general (b. 1933)
  2015   – Tekena Tamuno, Nigerian historian and academic (b. 1932)
2017 – J. Geils, American singer and guitarist (b. 1946)
  2017   – Mark Wainberg, Canadian researcher and HIV/AIDS activist (b. 1945)
2020 – John Horton Conway, English mathematician (b. 1937)

Holidays and observances
Christian feast day:
Antipas of Pergamum (Greek Orthodox Church)
Barsanuphius
Gemma Galgani
Godeberta
Guthlac of Crowland
George Selwyn (Anglicanism)
Stanislaus of Szczepanów
April 11 (Eastern Orthodox liturgics)
Juan Santamaría Day, anniversary of his death in the Second Battle of Rivas. (Costa Rica)
International Louie Louie Day
World Parkinson's Day

References

External links

 BBC: On This Day
 
 Historical Events on April 11

Days of the year
April